Polythlipta annulifera is a moth of the family Crambidae. It is found in South Africa and in Madagascar.

References

Moths described in 1866
Spilomelinae
Moths of Madagascar
Moths of Africa